Hazm al-ʿUdayn District is a district of the Ibb Governorate, Yemen. As of 2003, the district had a population of 79,483 inhabitants.

References

Districts of Ibb Governorate
Hazm al-'Udayn District